Bentham is a railway station on the Bentham Line, which runs between  and  via . It is owned by Network Rail and managed by Northern Trains.

History
The station was opened as Bentham on 1 June 1850 by the "Little" North Western Railway, later taken over by the Midland Railway. On 1 November 1851, the station was renamed Bentham High, to avoid confusion with the nearby station at Low Bentham. This station was short-lived, and closed on 4 August 1853.

The station was provided with various facilities by the Midland Railway, including a signal box, water tower and column, goods shed and several sidings on the northern side of the line.  These had all been removed by the early 1970s, with the signal box being the last to go in 1972.

The station building, which was constructed in the mid-1950s, after the original Midland structure was demolished by British Railways, is now privately owned. The station was reduced to unstaffed halt status in October 1970.

The station has had its own community volunteer support group, The Friends of Bentham Station, since September 2011. The group is based in the aforementioned building on the eastbound platform and has support from various local organisations, including the route's Rail User Group, Craven District Council and the Leeds, Lancaster and Morecambe Line Community Rail Partnership.

Stationmasters

B. Jenkinson until 1860
W.F. Jacques 1861 - 1863
J. Bond from 1863
John Bell ca. 1869
Benjamin Ash ca. 1871 - 1883 
Joseph Shaw 1883 - 1888 (In 1887 he was knocked down by a train at the station which severed his arm)
E. Baldwin 1888 - 1890
Charles Larkin 1890 - ca. 1911 (formerly station master at Collingham)
James Roadley 1914 - 1924 (afterwards station master at Appleby)
Augustine Angus from 1924 (formerly station master at Stretton)
W. Fox

Facilities
Timetable posters and digital information screens on both platforms provide train running information, whilst there are waiting shelters on each side. The stone shelter on the westbound platform was constructed by the Midland Railway, whereas its counterpart on the opposite platform is much more modern in comparison.

Services

There are eight departures each way (increased from seven the start of the May 2019 timetable).

On Sundays there are now five services in each direction throughout the year (all running to/from Morecambe since the winter 2019 timetable update). The alterations to give better journey opportunities for commuters to both Leeds and Lancaster (and additional Sunday services) were implemented at the May 2018 timetable change. Further station improvements are also planned, such as the installation of ticket machines, video help points and improved lighting.

References

Sources

 Bairstow, M. (2000), The 'Little' North Western Railway, Martin Bairstow, Leeds, 
Dewick, T. (2002), Complete Atlas of Railway Station Names, Ian Allan Publishing, Hersham,

External links
 
 

Craven District
DfT Category F2 stations
Railway stations in North Yorkshire
Former Midland Railway stations
Railway stations in Great Britain opened in 1850
Northern franchise railway stations